Josh Foley may refer to:

 Elixir_(comics), alter ego Josh Foley, a Marvel Comics character
 Josh Foley (artist) (born 1983), Australian artist